Miłosz Matysik (born 26 April 2004) is a Polish professional footballer who plays as either a centre-back or a defensive midfielder for Jagiellonia Białystok.

Career statistics

Club

Notes

References

External links

2004 births
Living people
Sportspeople from Białystok
Association football defenders
Association football midfielders
Polish footballers
Poland youth international footballers
Jagiellonia Białystok players
III liga players
Ekstraklasa players